Monterey Park Tract is a census-designated place (CDP) in Stanislaus County, California. The 2010 United States census reported Monterey Park Tract's population was 133.

Geography
According to the United States Census Bureau, the CDP covers an area of 0.05 square miles (0.12 km), all of it land.

Demographics
The 2010 United States Census reported that Monterey Park Tract had a population of 133. The racial makeup of Monterey Park Tract was 77 (57.9%) White, 17 (12.8%) African American, 0 (0.0%) Native American, 0 (0.0%) Asian, 0 (0.0%) Pacific Islander, 38 (28.6%) from other races, and 1 (0.8%) from two or more races. Hispanic or Latino of any race were 112 persons (84.2%).

The Census reported that 133 people (100% of the population) lived in households, 0 (0%) lived in non-institutionalized group quarters, and 0 (0%) were institutionalized.

There were 35 households, out of which 18 (51.4%) had children under the age of 18 living in them, 17 (48.6%) were opposite-sex married couples living together, 8 (22.9%) had a female householder with no husband present, 3 (8.6%) had a male householder with no wife present.  There were 2 (5.7%) unmarried opposite-sex partnerships, and 0 (0%) same-sex married couples or partnerships. 7 households (20.0%) were made up of individuals, and 2 (5.7%) had someone living alone who was 65 years of age or older. The average household size was 3.80.  There were 28 families (80.0% of all households); the average family size was 4.25.

The population was spread out, with 46 people (34.6%) under the age of 18, 16 people (12.0%) aged 18 to 24, 30 people (22.6%) aged 25 to 44, 28 people (21.1%) aged 45 to 64, and 13 people (9.8%) who were 65 years of age or older.  The median age was 26.6 years. For every 100 females, there were 90.0 males.  For every 100 females age 18 and over, there were 97.7 males.

The homeowner vacancy rate was 15.8%; the rental vacancy rate was 9.1%.  43 people (32.3% of the population) lived in owner-occupied housing units and 90 people (67.7%) lived in rental housing units.

References

Census-designated places in Stanislaus County, California
Census-designated places in California